The 2015–2017 ICC Intercontinental Cup was the seventh edition of the ICC Intercontinental Cup, an international first-class cricket tournament between leading associate members of the International Cricket Council (ICC). The tournament took place during 2015 to 2017. It ran in parallel with the 2015–17 ICC World Cricket League Championship, but with slightly different teams. As Ireland and Afghanistan had qualified for the ICC One Day International Championship ranking qualification process, they were replaced by Kenya and Nepal in the limited over event; however they continued to play the four-day event.

As a result of changes to the structure of international cricket announced by the ICC in January 2014, the winner of the 2015-17 Intercontinental Cup (and following editions of the tournament) were originally scheduled to play four five-day matches against the bottom ranked Test nation (two home and two away matches), an event known as the 2018 ICC Test Challenge. Should the  winner of the Intercontinental Cup go on to win the ICC Test Challenge, they would have become the 11th Test nation.

However, in February 2017 following an ICC Board meeting, changes were agreed in principle to expand the number of Test nations to twelve. Both Afghanistan and Ireland were likely to be granted Test status before the proposed 2018 ICC Test Challenge. In June 2017, the ICC awarded both Afghanistan and Ireland Full Member status, making them eligible to play Test match cricket. As a result, the planned Test Challenge was scrapped.

Afghanistan won the competition, after beating the United Arab Emirates by 10 wickets in their final game. They finished with 121 points, with Ireland as runners-up on 109 points. Rashid Khan, man of the match for Afghanistan in the final fixture, said that winning the Intercontinental Cup was "good preparation for Test cricket for us".

Teams
The following are the 8 teams participating in the competition based on the results from 2011–13 ICC World Cricket League Championship, 2014 Cricket World Cup Qualifier and the 2015 ICC World Cricket League Division Two.
  (1st in 2011–13 ICC World Cricket League Championship)
  (2nd in 2011–13 ICC World Cricket League Championship)
  (1st in 2014 Cricket World Cup Qualifier)
  (2nd in 2014 Cricket World Cup Qualifier)
  (3rd in 2014 Cricket World Cup Qualifier)
  (4th in 2014 Cricket World Cup Qualifier)
  (1st in 2015 ICC World Cricket League Division Two)
  (2nd in 2015 ICC World Cricket League Division Two)

Preparations
Of the eight teams participating in the 2015–17 ICC Intercontinental Cup, only Papua New Guinea has never played a first-class match before. Afghanistan, Ireland, Namibia, Scotland, The Netherlands and the UAE had all appeared before in the previous Intercontinental Cup of 2011-2013, while Hong Kong had last appeared in the 2005 Intercontinental Cup and last played in an international multi-day cricket tournament in late 2006 at the 2006/07 ACC Fast Track Countries Tournament.

Though never having played a first-class match, Papua New Guinea (PNG) have played two-day cricket in the South Australian Premier League in 2013 and 2014. Though finishing at the bottom of the league in both seasons, the experience seems to have hardened the team as they convincingly beat Hong Kong in a three-day match in Australia and one of PNG's openers admitted that participation in the league had been critical to exposing the players to multi-day cricket.

Fixtures
The breakdown of fixtures is as follows:

Points table

Win – 14 points
Ti.e. – 7 points
Draw (if more than 10 hours of play lost) – 7 points (otherwise 3 points)
Abandoned without a ball bowled – 10 points
First Innings lead (independent of final result) – 6 points (3 points each in case of a first innings tie)

Matches

Round 1
The fixtures for round one were announced on 5 May 2015.

Round 2
The fixtures for round two were announced in August 2015.

Round 3
The fixtures for round three were announced in December 2015.

Round 4
The fixtures for round four were announced in April 2016.

Round 5
The fixture between Afghanistan and Ireland was announced by Cricket Ireland in July 2016. The fixture between Hong Kong and the Netherlands was announced by the Koninklijke Nederlandse Cricket Bond in December 2016. Cricket Scotland confirmed the venue for their fixture in February 2017.

Round 6

Round 7
The ICC announced the dates and venues for the final round of fixtures on 23 October 2017.

See also
 2015-17 ICC World Cricket League Championship

References

External links
 Series home at ESPN Cricinfo

ICC Intercontinental Cup
International cricket competitions in 2015
International cricket competitions in 2015–16
International cricket competitions in 2016
International cricket competitions in 2016–17
International cricket competitions in 2017
International cricket competitions in 2017–18